The 1947 World Table Tennis Championships were held in Paris from February 25 to March 7, 1947.

Medalists

Team

Individual

References

External links
ITTF Museum

 
World Table Tennis Championships
World Table Tennis Championships
World Table Tennis Championships
Table tennis competitions in France
World Table Tennis Championships
World Table Tennis Championships
World Table Tennis Championships
International sports competitions hosted by Paris